Pablo Torre may refer to:
 Pablo Torre (director), Argentine producer, film director, and screenplay writer
 Pablo Torre (footballer) (born 2003), Spanish footballer
 Pablo S. Torre, Filipino-American sportswriter